430 West Records is an independent record label based in Detroit, Michigan, United States, formed in 1990 by Lawrence Burden, Lenny Burden, and Lynell Burden, just months after recording their debut record for Derrick Mays' Transmat label. 430 West was formed as an outlet for the Burden Brothers' own productions (recording as Octave One, Random Noise Generation, Never On Sunday, and Metro D). Later it was expanded to be the home for releases by electronic music artists Jay Denham, Terrence Parker, Eddie Fowlkes, Aux 88, Wild Planet, and Gerald Mitchell, among others. In 1998, 430 West also became the musical home for the trio's youngest brothers, Lance Burden and Lorne Burden.

As of 2000, 430 West functions as a production company and record label, focusing once again on the work of the Burden Brothers. The company has distribution, licensing, and promotion relationships in North America, Europe, United Kingdom, and Japan.

Discography
1990:  4W-100  	Octave One - Octivation The EP  (12", EP, Promo) 	
1991:  4W-100B  	Octave One - Octivation The EP  (12", EP) 
1991:  4W-110 	Metro D - What Is A Dancer? (12") 	
1991:  4W-120 	Random Noise Generation - Falling In Dub (12") 
1991:  4W-125 	Eddie Flashin Fowlkes - Inequality (12") 
1991:  4W-140 	Vice - Survival Instinct (12") 
1992:  4W-145 	Terrence Parker  - TP1 (12") 
1992:  4W-150 	Random Noise Generation - Falling In Dub (The Remixes) (12") 
1992:  4W-155 	Terrence Parker And D.J.B. - The Call My Name (The Remixes) (12")
1992:  4W-160 	Metro D - In The City (12") 	
1992:  4W-165 	Never On Sunday - Day By Day (12") 	
1992:  4W-175 	Sight Beyond Sight - Good Stuff 	(12") 	
1993:  4W-130 	Random Noise Generation - Random Beats & Tracks Vol. I  (12")
1993:  4W-180 	Mind Readers - Living My Life Underground (12") 
1993:  4W-185 	Family Of Few  - Sunrise (12") 	
1993:  4WCS-190 	Aux 88 - Bass Magnetic (Cass, Album) 	
1993:  NEVER 1 	Various  - 430 West Sampler EP 	(12", W/Lbl, EP) 
1994:  4W-130 	Random Noise Generation - Random Beats & Tracks Vol. I & II (2x12") 
1994:  4W-190 	Aux 88 - Bass Magnetic (2x12", Ltd) 	
1994:  4W-195 	Tokyo Gospel Renegades - Tokyo Soul (12") 	
1994:  4W-200 	Unit 2 - Keep Your Head Up (2x12") 	
1994:  4W-205 	L'Homme Van Renn - The Man (12") 	
1994:  4W-210 	365 Black - Home Land 	(12") 
1994:  4W-215 	Sight Beyond Sight - No More Tears 	(12") 	
1994:  4W-220 	Octave One - The "X" Files 	(2x12") 	
1994:  4W-225 	Random Noise Generation - Random Beats & Tracks Vol. 3 (12") 
1995:  4W-230 	Alien FM - Alien FM (2x12") 	
1995:  4W-235 	Various - Detroit Techno City (12") 	
1995:  4W-240 	Octave One - Foundation EP (12") 	
1995:  4W-245 	Octave One - Conquered Nation 	(12") 	
1995:  4W-250 	Bobby Ceal - The Middle Passage (12") 
1995:  4W-255 	Octave One - Cymbolic (2x12") 
1995:  4W-260 	Unknown Force - Circuit Maximus / Internal Drive (12") 
1995:  4W-MS10 	Octave One - I Believe (12") 	
1996: 4W-265 	Octave One - Point Blank (12") 	
1996:  4W-270 	Various - Detroit Techno City II (12") 	
1996:  4W-275 	Random Noise Generation - Generations Of Soul (12") 
1996:  4W-280 	Octave One - Images From Above (2x12") 	
1997:  4W-285 	Random Noise Generation - The Legacy (12") 	
1997:  4W-290 	Octave One - The Living Key (2x12") 	
1997:  4WCD-2 	Octave One - The Living Key (To Images From Above) (CD, Album) 
1998:  4W-291 	Mad Mike* & DJ Rolando / Octave One - Aztlan / DayStar Rising (12") 
1998:  4W-295 	Wildplanet - Synthetic (12") 	
1998:  4W-300 	Octave One - The Collective (2x12", Compilation) 
1998:  4WCD-1 	Aux 88 Meets Alien FM - 88 FM (CD, compilation album) 
1998:  4WCD-300 	Octave One - The Collective (CD, compilation album) 
1999:  4W-305 	Random Noise Generation - Instrument Of Change (12") 
1999:  4W-310 	Octave One - Art And Soul (12") 	
1999:  4W-315 	Gerald Mitchell - Groove Within The Groove (12") 
1999:  4W-320 	Wild Planet - Genetic Remixes (12") 	
1999:  4W-325 	Octave One Presents Kaotic Spacial Rhythms - M-Class / Kaotic Space(12") 
1999:  4W-330 	Random Noise Generation - The Existence Of Echelon (12") 
1999:  4W-335 	Octave One Presents Kaotic Spacial Rhythm - Kaotic Spacial Rhythms Two  (12")
1999:  4W-400 	Wild Planet - Transmitter (2x12") 	
1999:  4WCD-400 	Wild Planet - Transmitter (CD, album) 	
2000:  430WUKT1 	DJ Rolando - Jaguar (12") 	
2000:  430WUKT2 	DJ Rolando - Jaguar (12", Ltd) 	
2000:  430WUKTCD1 	DJ Rolando A.k.a. Aztec Mystic - Jaguar (CD, Maxi) 
2000:  430WUKTCD2 	DJ Rolando - Jaguar (CD, Enh, Maxi) 	
2000:  4W-340 	Octave One - Black Water 	(12") 	
2000:  4W-345 	Octave One Presents Kaotic Spacial Rhythms - Kaotic Spacial Rhythms Three - Barrage (12")
2000:  4W-350 	DJ Rolando - Jaguar (Mayday Remixes) (12") 
2000:  4W-45011 	Random Noise Generation -  Links In The Chain (2x12", compilation) 	
2000:  4WCD-4049 	DJ Rolando - Jaguar 	(CD, Maxi) 	
2000:  4WCD-45012 	Random Noise Generation - Links In The Chain (CD, compilation album) 
2002:  4W-500 	Random Noise Generation - The Unknown (12") 
2002:  4W-505 	KSR - Down From The Sky (12") 
2004:  4W-370 	Random Noise Generation - Games Of Chance (4 Mixes) (12", W/Lbl, Promo) 
2004:  4W-380 	Random Noise Generation Featuring Lance Burden - A Better Tomorrow / Roof Raiser (12") 
2005:  4W-385 	Octave One - Somedays (12") 	
2005:  4W-390 	Random Noise Generation - Rock My Soul (12") 
2006:  4WDVD560 	Octave One - Off The Grid 	(DVD-10, PAL, NTSC) 
2008:  4W-590 Octave One - I Need Release (12") 
2009:  4WCD-600 	Octave One - Summers on Jupiter (CD, album) 
2009:  4W-600 	Octave One 	Summers on Jupiter	(2X12")

See also
 List of record labels

References

External links
 430 West Records discography at Discogs.
 Official Website.

American record labels
Techno record labels
History of Detroit
Electronic music record labels
Companies based in Detroit